Malathion is an organophosphate insecticide which acts as an acetylcholinesterase inhibitor. In the USSR, it was known as carbophos, in New Zealand and Australia as maldison and in South Africa as mercaptothion.

Pesticide use
Malathion is a pesticide that is widely used in agriculture, residential landscaping, public recreation areas, and in public health pest control programs such as mosquito eradication. In the US, it is the most commonly used organophosphate insecticide.

A malathion mixture with corn syrup was used in the 1980s in Australia and California to combat the Mediterranean fruit fly. In Canada and the US starting in the early 2000s, malathion was sprayed in many cities to combat west Nile virus. Malathion was used over the last couple of decades on a regular basis during summer months to kill mosquitoes, but homeowners were allowed an exemption for their properties if they chose..

Mechanism of action
Malathion is an acetylcholinesterase inhibitor, a diverse family of chemicals. Upon uptake into the target organism, it binds irreversibly to the serine residue in the active catalytic site of the cholinesterase enzyme. The resultant phosphoester group is strongly bound to the cholinesterase, and irreversibly deactivates the enzyme which leads to rapid build-up of acetylcholine at the synapse.

Production method
Malathion  is produced by the addition of dimethyl dithiophosphoric acid to diethyl maleate or diethyl fumarate. The compound is chiral but is used as a racemate.

Medical use
Malathion in low doses (0.5% preparations) is used as a treatment for:
 Head lice and body lice.  Malathion is approved by the US Food and Drug Administration for treatment of pediculosis. It is claimed to effectively kill both the eggs and the adult lice, but in fact has been shown in UK studies to be only 36% effective on head lice, and less so on their eggs.  This low efficiency was noted when malathion was applied to lice found on schoolchildren in the Bristol area in the UK, and it is assumed to be  caused by the lice having developed resistance against malathion.
 Scabies

Preparations include Derbac-M, Prioderm, Quellada-M and Ovide.

Safety

General
Malathion is of low toxicity. In arthropods it is metabolized into malaoxon which is 61x more toxic, being a more potent inhibitor of acetylcholinesterase.According to the United States Environmental Protection Agency, no reliable information is available on adverse health effects of chronic exposure.
In 1981, Malathion was sprayed over a  area to control an outbreak of Mediterranean fruit flies in California.  In order to demonstrate the chemical's safety, B. T. Collins, director of the California Conservation Corps, publicly swallowed a mouthful of dilute malathion solution.

Carcinogenicity
Malathion is classified by the IARC as probable carcinogen (group 2A).  Malathion is classified by US EPA as having "suggestive evidence of carcinogenicity". This classification was based on the occurrence of liver tumors at excessive doses in mice and female rats and the presence of rare oral and nasal tumors in rats that occurred following exposure to very large doses.  Exposure to organophosphates is associated with non-Hodgkin's lymphoma. Malathion used as a fumigant was not associated with increased cancer risk.  Between 1993 and 1997, as part of the Agricultural Health Study, no clear association between malathion exposure and cancer was reported.

Amphibians
Malathion is toxic to leopard frog tadpoles.

Resistance
Because it is an acetylcholinesterase inhibitor, this resistance is a type of AChEI resistance. Malathion resistance is thought to always be due to either increased carboxylesterase concentrations or altered acetylcholinesterases. COE because it metabolizes malathion but into non-malaoxon products, altered AChEs because we mean specifically those altered to be less sensitive to malathion and malaoxon.

See also
 Isomalathion
 Pesticide toxicity to bees

References

External links
 Malathion Technical Fact Sheet - National Pesticide Information Center
 Malathion General Fact Sheet - National Pesticide Information Center
 Malathion Pesticide Information Profile - Extension Toxicology Network
 ATSDR ToxFAQs
 CDC - NIOSH Pocket Guide to Chemical Hazards
 Re-evaluation of Malathion by the Pest Management Regulatory Agency of Canada
 

Acetylcholinesterase inhibitors
Antiparasitic agents
Endocrine disruptors
Insecticides
Organophosphate insecticides
Phosphorodithioates